The Power Cosmic is Bal-Sagoth's fourth album, released in 1999. The album was Bal-Sagoth's first recording for Nuclear Blast.

This was the first Bal-Sagoth album to not contain a full lyric booklet (on their earlier releases, they would include a lyric booklet that contained not only song lyrics but an accompanying story by vocalist/lyricist Byron Roberts). The full version of the lyric booklet was initially featured as exclusive downloadable content at the band's official website, and was later released with the Russian sub-licensed edition of the album. This was the only version of The Power Cosmic which featured a full lyric booklet until the album's digipack reissue of November 2011, released by Metal Mind Productions, which included an expanded version of the lyrics and significantly more story content written by Bal-Sagoth lyricist Byron Roberts.

The primary story within the album is that of Zurra, a rogue demigod who is released from his imprisonment beneath the Mare Imbrium and searches space to reassemble the powerful artifact known as the Empyreal Lexicon. The song "Of Carnage and a Gathering of the Wolves" takes place in Darkenhold forest, a location last referenced in track 9 of the album Starfire Burning Upon the Ice-Veiled Throne of Ultima Thule.

"The Scourge of the Fourth Celestial Host" references Marvel Comics hero The Silver Surfer battling the Fourth Celestial Host. Within the lyrics, The Silver Surfer is referred to by the name Norrin-Radd, Thor is referenced by mention of his "uru hammer", and Galactus is referred to by the name Galan of Taa. The celestials Arishem and Exitar, the watcher Uatu, and Shalla-Bal are also referenced within the song and lyrics. The album title itself, The Power Cosmic, is a reference to the superpowers possessed by Galactus and the Silver Surfer, and was chosen primarily because Byron Roberts is a great admirer of Marvel Comics and particularly the works of Jack Kirby, as mentioned in the 50th issue of the magazine "The Jack Kirby Collector".

In November 2011, The Power Cosmic was reissued as a limited edition digipack by Nuclear Blast's affiliate label Metal Mind Productions. The reissue featured an expanded lyric booklet, additional artwork, and remastered audio.

In July 2013, The Power Cosmic was released on CD in Argentina via Icarus Music under license from Nuclear Blast GmbH.

On 16 October 2020, The Power Cosmic was reissued as a digipak CD edition via Dissonance Productions.

In July 2021, a limited edition vinyl LP version of The Power Cosmic was released by the Italian specialist vinyl label Night of the Vinyl Dead.

In May 2022, The Power Cosmic was reissued as a single disc gatefold sleeve LP edition via the UK specialist vinyl label Back On Black.

Track listing

Personnel 
 Byron Roberts – vocals
 Chris Maudling – guitars
 Jonny Maudling – keyboards
 Mark Greenwell – bass
 Dave Mackintosh – drums

Additional personnel
 Martin Hanford - cover art
 Mags - engineering, producer, mixing
 J.C. Dhien - photography

References 

Bal-Sagoth albums
1999 albums